Eugoa sinuata is a moth of the family Erebidae. It is found in Taiwan.

References

 Natural History Museum Lepidoptera generic names catalog

sinuata
Moths described in 1914